Gervase Bedford Du Croz (1820 – 19 February 1855) was an Australian cricket player, who played one game each for both Tasmania, and Victoria.

He has the distinction of having participated in the first ever first-class cricket match in Australia, in which he opened the batting for Tasmania.

Du Croz died on 19 February 1855, in Launceston, Tasmania aged 35.

References

External links

1820 births
1855 deaths
Australian cricketers
Tasmania cricketers
Victoria cricketers
Cricketers from Greater London
English emigrants to Australia